That Night in Rio is a 1941 Technicolor American musical comedy film directed by Irving Cummings and starring Alice Faye, Don Ameche (in a dual role as an American entertainer and an aristocratic businessman he is asked to impersonate temporarily) and Carmen Miranda. It is one of several film adaptations of the 1934 play The Red Cat by Rudolf Lothar and Hans Adler. Others are Folies Bergère de Paris (1935) and On the Riviera (1951).

The original songs for the film were written by the musical partnership of Harry Warren and Mack Gordon. These include: "Boa Noite", "They Met in Rio (A Midnight Serenade)", "Chica Chica Boom Chic" and "I, Yi, Yi, Yi, Yi (I Like You Very Much)".

Plot
Larry Martin (Don Ameche) is an American entertainer in the Casino Samba in Rio de Janeiro. He has a skit in his show, making fun of the womanizing Baron Manuel Duarte (also Ameche). On one particular evening, the Baron and his wife, Baroness Cecilia Duarte (Alice Faye) come to see Larry's impersonation. To the surprise of the couple, the act is amazingly realistic. Backstage, the Baron meets Larry's girlfriend, Carmen (Carmen Miranda), and invites her to a party he is going to hold. Carmen declines.

Later in the evening, Larry meets Cecilia and is attracted to her singing and her beauty. He does an impersonation of the Baron for her. But the real Baron receives a telegram that his airline is in danger because a contract is not being renewed and he has already purchased 51% of the stock. Needing money to repay the bank he borrowed it from, he flies down to Buenos Aires.

Larry is hired to play the Baron to confuse his rival, Machado (J. Carrol Naish), but at the stock market, he buys the remainder of the airline stock. That evening, at the party, Larry is hired again to play the Baron. He does not want the Baroness to know, but Cecilia is informed without his knowing. He sweeps her off her feet and they stay close to each other for the remainder of the evening.

Meanwhile, Carmen is furious to discover that Larry is at the party and decides to go there as well, where she discovers that he is impersonating the Baron. To make matter worse, the real Baron returns to his house, confusing all involved. Machado corners Larry instead and talks to him in French, which Larry can't understand. After the party, the Baron discovers that Cecilia was flirting with Larry for the evening and tries to play the joke on her. She, however, inadvertently turns the tables on him.

To get back at his wife, the next morning, the Baron calls and tells Cecilia that his plane has just landed. Cecilia fears that she has been unfaithful to Manuel but Larry later tells her the truth. At the office, Machado gives the Baron a payment of $32 million for his airline, the topic of his conversation with Larry. The Baron heads home but Cecilia tries one more time to get back at him by pretending to make violent love (in the old-fashioned sense) to Larry. It turns out to be the Baron and all is soon resolved in the end.

Cast

 Don Ameche as Larry Martin / Baron Manuel Duarte
 Alice Faye as Baroness Cecilia Duarte
 Carmen Miranda as Carmen, Larry's girlfriend
 S. Z. Sakall as Arthur Penna
 J. Carrol Naish as Machado, Manuel Duarte's business rival
 Curt Bois as Felicio Salles
 Leonid Kinskey as Monsieur Pierre Dufond
 Frank Puglia as Pedro, Manuel's valet
 Lillian Porter as Luiza, Cecilia's maid
 Maria Montez as Inez
 Georges Renavent as Ambassador
 Eddie Conrad as Alfonso
 Fortunio Bonanova as Pereira

Production 

The film was a follow-up to the successful Down Argentine Way and involved many of the same people.

The movie's working titles were "A Latin from Manhattan", "Rings on Her Fingers", "They Met in Rio" and "The Road to Rio". According to The Hollywood Reporter of November 15, 1940, Paramount objected to the proposed title The Road to Rio because it created confusion with that studio's Road to Zanzibar starring Bing Crosby and Bob Hope. That Night in Rio marked the sixth and final teaming of Don Ameche and Alice Faye, one of Fox's most popular teams. Faye and Ameche recorded and filmed the song "Chica Chica Boom Chic" as a dance number, but only the sequence of Miranda and Ameche singing the song is in the released picture. Irving Cummings directed the screenplay by George Seaton, Bess Meredyth and Hal Long.

According to a letter from studio head Darryl F. Zanuck, the script for That Night in Rio had been submitted to the Brazilian Ambassador in Washington, D.C., who approved it and described it as "the kind of picture that will be helpful to North and South America relations."

A report in the MPAA/PCA filed noted that the picture was rejected for distribution in Ireland, although no reason was given.

Soundtrack 
 "Chica Chica Boom Chic" — Don Ameche and Carmen Miranda
 "The Baron Is in Conference" — Mary Ann Hyde, Vivian Mason, Barbara Lynn, Jean O'Donnell
 "The Conference" — Don Ameche
 "They Met in Rio (A Midnight Serenade)" - Don Ameche (in Portuguese) and Alice Faye (in English)
 "Cai Cai" — Carmen Miranda
 "I, Yi, Yi, Yi, Yi (I Like You Very Much)" — Carmen Miranda
 "Boa Noite (Good-Night)" — Don Ameche, Alice Faye and Carmen Miranda

Reception

The film was released in theaters on April 11, 1941, to enthusiastic audiences and mildly appreciative critics, with Miranda stealing the notices. Variety  wrote that "Ameche is very capable in a dual role, and Miss Faye is eye-appealing, but it's the tempestuous Miranda who really gets away to a flying start from the first sequence." The Hollywood Reporter described her as "vivid, fiery and tempestuous," and The Los Angeles Herald-Examiner wrote that she was "outfitted in smart, barbaric colors, waving articulate hips and rollicking through the most fun of her Hollywood career." The Sydney Daily Mirror, said that "Apparently exotic Carmen Miranda's lips are as fascinating as her hands."

Bosley Crowther of The New York Times dryly noted that "In spite of its hot Latin rhythms and the presence of Carmen Miranda in the cast, That Night in Rio departs but little from the stock musical comedy formula, which inevitably sacrifices originality... In fact, the only departure of even slightly revolutionary degree is the employment of Don Ameche in dual roles, instead of his customary single one - and that, in the eyes of some people (including ourself), is hardly a step in the right direction."

In a much later review for the Chicago Reader newspaper, Dave Kehr wrote: "Shrieking Technicolor and Carmen Miranda are the main attractions in this routine Fox musical from 1941."

The film is recognized by American Film Institute in these lists:
 2006: AFI's Greatest Movie Musicals – Nominated

References

External links

 
 
 
 

1941 films
1941 musical comedy films
American musical comedy films
1940s English-language films
American films based on plays
Films set in Rio de Janeiro (city)
20th Century Fox films
Films produced by Darryl F. Zanuck
Films directed by Irving Cummings
Remakes of American films
1940s American films